Fred Gallagher may refer to:

Fred Gallagher (cartoonist) (born 1968), American illustrator and web cartoonist
Fred Gallagher (co-driver) (born 1952), World Rally Championship winning co-driver from Northern Ireland
Fred Gallagher (footballer) (born 1931), Australian rules footballer